Svetlana Antić, née Mugoša (born November 13, 1964 in Podgorica, Montenegro), is a former Yugoslav handball player who competed in the 1984 Summer Olympics and in the 1988 Summer Olympics.

In 1984, she was a member of the Yugoslav handball team, which won the gold medal. She played three matches and scored two goals. Four years later, she was part of the Yugoslav team that finished fourth. She played all five matches and scored 15 goals.

She later competed in the women's tournament at the 2000 Summer Olympics, representing Austria.

References

External links
Profile at Databaseolympics.com

1964 births
Living people
Sportspeople from Podgorica
Austrian female handball players
Yugoslav female handball players
Montenegrin female handball players
Handball players at the 1984 Summer Olympics
Handball players at the 1988 Summer Olympics
Handball players at the 2000 Summer Olympics
Olympic handball players of Yugoslavia
Olympic gold medalists for Yugoslavia
Olympic medalists in handball
Medalists at the 1984 Summer Olympics